Rivertown is a upcoming themed at the Dreamworld amusement park on the Gold Coast, Queensland, Australia. It will replace the existing ABC Kids World and provide a link between Main Street and the Dreamworld Corroboree. The area previously existed from the park's opening in 1981 until being merged into Main Street in the 2010s.

History
Rivertown opened with the park in 1981. The area originally was home to the Avis Vintage Cars which have since been relocated to the Australian Wildlife Experience. The Avis Vintage Cars were located where Mick Doohan's Motocoaster currently exists. At opening the area was home to the Captain Sturt Paddle Wheeler (John Longhurst's signature attraction) and the Avis Vintage Cars. In 2012, the Captain Sturt Paddle Wheeler ceased operations.

On 24 November 2022, Dreamworld announced that Rivertown would be returning, replacing the existing ABC Kids World which took over much of the original Rivertown's footprints. The return of Rivertown is also to come with the introduction of new attraction and is expected to open in late-2024.

Attractions

Future attractions

Jungle Rush
Jungle Rush is a upcoming family roller coaster to be built by Vekoma. The ride is expected to have 12 airtime elements, dedicated show movements, the ability to operate in both a forwards and backwards direction, and immersive theming with storytelling. The ride is expected to open in late-2024 with the return of Rivertown.

Murrissippi Motors

Murrissippi Motors is a upcoming relocation and refurbishment of the Vintage Car Adventure attraction.

Original Rivertown attractions

Avis Vintage Cars

Avis Vintage Cars (now Vintage Car Adventure) is a vintage cars attraction where guests could ride in replicas of 1911 Model T Fords alongside the Murrissippi River. In 2007, the attraction was relocated to the Australian Wildlife Experience area (now Dreamworld Corroboree). The attraction is expected to return to Rivertown in late-2024 as the Murrissippi Motors as part of the Rivertown's return.

Captain Sturt Paddle Wheeler
The Captain Sturt Paddle Wheeler was a operational paddle wheeler. When it was operating, it was a gentle boat ride along the man-made Murrissipi River. The ride is of a similar style to the Mark Twain Riverboat at several Disney theme parks around the world. The ride opened with the park in 1981. The channel which the boat tours is called the Murrissipi River and took Dreamworld founder, John Longhurst, two years to construct working seven 12-hour days a week. The ride originally featured a bush show themed to the era of Ned Kelly. This was discontinued when Farmyard Friends was constructed during 2005. The attraction closed in 2012.

Mick Doohan's Motocoaster

Mick Doohan's Motocoaster (now Motocoaster) is an Intamin Motorbike Launch Roller Coaster named after the Moto GP champion Michael Doohan. Although being classified as one of Dreamworld's Big 8 Thrill Rides, the ride failed to gain support within its first year of operation. Motocoaster still operates as part of Main Street.

Tower of Terror II

Tower of Terror II was a steel shuttle roller coaster which was ranked the fourth fastest roller coaster in the world. Opening on 23 January 1997, the ride held the world's fastest roller coaster record by itself for two months before Superman: The Escape opened which caused the ride to share the top spot. Tower of Terror II closed in 2019.Although the ride is not actually located in any particular themed zone, the main portion of track crosses Rivertown and is therefore included here.

Shopping & Dining
Upon exiting Mick Doohan's Motocoaster guests receive the opportunity to purchase on-ride photos as well as a variety of racing merchandise from Motocoaster Photos and Motocoaster Pit Stop Shop. Across the pathway from the ride guests can purchase food and beverage items at Fast Foods. Similarly, the Tower of Terror Warehouse offers appropriate merchandise for the ride. The Motocoaster Pit Stop Shop is still operating as part of Main Street.

References

Themed areas in Dreamworld (Australia)
Dreamworld (Australia)
Amusement rides introduced in 1981